Hubmann is a surname. Notable people with the surname include:

Daniel Hubmann (born 1983), Swiss orienteer
Martin Hubmann (born 1989), Swiss orienteer